The Police of Russia is the national law-enforcement agency in Russia, operating under the Ministry of Internal Affairs from . It was established  by decree from Peter the Great and in 2011, replacing the Militsiya, the former police service.

It is the national police service of Russia that operates according to the law “On police” (Закон "о полиции"), as approved by the Federal Assembly, and subsequently signed into law on February 7, 2011, by then President of the Russian Federation, Dmitry Medvedev.

History 
The system was created to protect the public order and to fight against crime in the Russian Empire. It was re-organized on March 1, 2011, under the Russian Federation (except for existing structures not related to the Ministry of Internal Affairs).

16th century 
In 1504, cheval de frise were installed in Moscow, under which the guards, drawn from the local population, were stationed. The city was divided into areas, between which gates with lattices were built. It was forbidden to move around the city at night or without lighting. Subsequently, the Grand Prince Ivan IV established patrols around Moscow for increased security.

The Sudebnik of Ivan IV transferred the cases "about guided robbers" to be under the jurisdiction of honorary elders. Before this, the Letters of Honor were like awards and were given by a petition of the population. These letters permitted local society to independently manage police work. In cities, police functions were guided by the mayor.

The Robber Administration was first mentioned in 1571 and existed continuously until the 18th century. Written sources from Moscow have mentioned the boyars and organized robbery since 1539. Konstantin Nevolin believed that the Robber Administration was a temporary commission established to end the robberies. However, since the robberies only intensified, the temporary commission turned into a standing committee, and thus, the Robber Administration remained.

17th century 
By a decree on August 14, 1687, the affairs of the Robber Administration were transferred to the Zemsky administrations. In April 1649, Grand Prince Alexis issued a decree on the urban blessing system previously used. By decree in the White City (now known as Belgorod), a team was to be created under the leadership of Ivan Novikov and clerk Vikula Panov. The detachment was supposed to maintain safety and order, as well as protect against fire. They were betrayed by five lattice clerks and "one person from 10 yards" with roars, axes, and water pipes.

Police officers in large cities were called Zemsky Yaryg. The color of the uniforms varied between cities. In Moscow, officers were dressed in red and green clothes. On the chest, they had the letters "З" (Z) and "Я" (YA) sewn.

In 1669, detectives universally replaced the role of honorary elders.

18th century 

The police force in Saint Petersburg was established as the Main Police in 1715 by decree from Peter the Great. Initially, the staff of the Saint Petersburg police consisted of the deputy general-police chief, 4 officers, and 36 lower ranks. The clerical and ten clerks kept office work in the Main Police Station Office. The police not only kept order in the city but also carried out several economic functions and were engaged in the improvement of the city — paving streets, draining swampy places, garbage collection, etc.

On June 7, 1718, Adjutant General Anton de Vieira was appointed General Polizeimeister. To aid him in completing work, the Chief Police Office was created and one army regiment was transferred to the authority of the General Polizeimeister. All the ranks of this regiment became police officers. Through the efforts of General de Vieira, in 1721, the first lanterns and benches for rest were installed in St. Petersburg.

On January 19, 1722, the Governing Senate established the Moscow Police. The Ober-Polizeimeister was to be appointed by the emperor from military or civilian ranks. By the instructions of July 20, 1722, the Ober-Polizeimeister supervised the protection of public peace in Moscow as head of the Moscow Police Office. Between 1729–1731 and 1762–1764, the head of the Moscow police was called the General Polizeimeister.

On April 23, 1733, Empress Anna signed a decree "On the establishment of police in cities." This decree gave the police legal powers and allowed them the right to impose penalties in criminal cases.

19th and 20th century 

In 1837, a regulation on the zemstvo police was issued, according to which the zemstvo police chief elected by the nobility became the head of the police in the uyezd. The police officers appointed by the provincial government were responsible to the governor, in turn the county or uedz police were responsible to county leaders appointed by the provincial government.

In 1862, a police reform was carried out. The title of mayor was abolished; city councils in those cities that were subordinate to the district police were attached to the zemstvo courts, renamed the district police departments, and in those cities that retained their own police, separate from the district police, they were renamed into city police departments.

In 1866, a zemstvo guard was established in the districts of the Kingdom of Poland.

In 1866, St. Petersburg Chief of Police Fyodor Trepov sent a note to Alexander II, which said: “A significant gap in the institution of the metropolitan police was the absence of a special part with the special purpose of conducting research for solving crimes, finding general measures to prevent and suppress crimes. These responsibilities lay with the ranks of the external police, which, bearing the entire burden of the police service, had neither the means nor the opportunity to act successfully in this respect. To eliminate this deficiency, it was proposed to establish a detective police”.

For the first time in the Russian police, specialized units for solving crimes and conducting inquiries were created in St. Petersburg, where in 1866 a detective police was established under the office of the police chief of the city. Prior to that, detective functions were carried out by forensic investigators and the entire police in the form in which it existed at that time. Initially, the staff of the criminal investigation of St. Petersburg was small. By the time of its foundation the department consisted, in addition to the chief and his assistant, 4 officials at special assignments, 12 police detectives and 20 civilian detectives.

The Detective Department was founded in 1866, operating under the Police Department of Ministry of Internal Affairs, and by 1907, similar departments had been created in other major cities of the Russian Empire, including Moscow, Kiev, Riga, Odessa, Tiflis, Baku, Rostov-on-Don and Nizhny Novgorod. Other districts were policed by rural police or gendarmerie units.

In 1879 the institute of police officers in rural areas was formed. The police officers were intended to help the police officers “for the performance of police duties, as well as for the supervision of the centurions and foremen.”

On August 6, 1880, the Third Section of His Imperial Majesty's Own Chancellery was abolished and the Police Department was formed.

Since 1889, the chief of the district police began to be called the district police officer.

In 1903, in the countryside, originally in 46 provinces, a district police guard was introduced. By 1916, it extended to 50 provinces.

On August 9, 1910, the Minister of Internal Affairs Pyotr Stolypin issued an Instruction to the officers of the detective departments, which determined their tasks and structure. Each detective department consisted of four structural divisions-desks:

 Personal detention.
 Searches.
 Observations.
 Information registration office.

By order of Pyotr Stolypin, at the Police Department, special courses were established to train the heads of detective departments. At the International Congress of Criminalists, held in Switzerland in 1913, the Russian detective police were recognized as the best in the world in solving crimes.

The 3,500 strong police force of Petrograd provided the main opposition to the rioting, which marked the initial outbreak of the February Revolution. After the army units garrisoning the city defected, the police became the main target of the revolutionaries, and many were killed. The Police of the Russian Empire was dissolved on March 10, 1917, and on April 17, the Provisional Government established the People's Militia (Militsiya) as a new law enforcement body.

Soviet Militsiya 

Decisions of the Provisional Government “On the approval of the militsiya” and "Temporary regulations on the police", issued on April 17, 1917, the "people's militia" was established. The people's militia is declared to be the executive body of state power at the local level, “directly under the jurisdiction of the zemstvo and city public administrations”.

Simultaneously with the state “people's militsiya”, the councils of workers 'deputies organized detachments of “workers' militsiya” and other armed formations, which were under the influence of various political forces, and sometimes outside them. At the same time, the workers' militsiya was not subordinate to the commissars of the city militsiya.

The Council of the Petrograd People's militsiya, formed on June 3 under the auspices of the Bolsheviks, came into conflict with the head of the city militsiya, issuing political slogans in connection with the refusal to pay additional payments for service in the workers' militsiya to workers receiving full wages in factories. The most important state structure will destroyed.

The principle of self-organization of the forces of law and order was implemented by the Bolshevik Party for some time after October 1917. The decree of the NKVD "On the workers' militia" of October 28 (November 10) 1917 did not provide for the organizational forms of the state militia apparatus.

The workers' militia bore the character of mass amateur organizations, was formed on the basis of voluntary squads, so it could not stop the rampant crime.

On May 10, 1918, the Collegium of the NKVD adopted an order: “The police exist as a permanent staff of persons performing special duties, the organization of the police should be carried out independently of the Red Army, their functions should be strictly delimited.”

The militsiya was formed on March 10, 1917, replacing the former Russian police organizations of the Imperial government. There were detachments of the people's militsiya and the workers' militsiya that were organized as paramilitary police units. After the dissolution of the Soviet Union, the militsiya continued to exist in Russia until March 1, 2011.

2011 Police reform 
Initiated by former President Dmitry Medvedev, Russian police reform (Закон РФ "о полиции" (Zakon RF "O politsii" {Law on police}) is an ongoing effort to improve the efficiency of Russia's police forces, decrease corruption, and improve the public image of law enforcement. On February 7, 2011, amendments were made to the laws of the police force, the criminal code, and the criminal procedure code. The amendments came into force on March 1, 2011. These changes stipulate a law enforcement personnel cut of 20%, renaming Russian law enforcers from "militsiya" (militia) to "politsiya" (police), substantial increases in wages, centralization of financing, and several other changes. Around 217 billion rubles ($7 billion) have been allocated from the federal budget to finance the reform.

Main changes and aims of the reform 
Name change Under the reform, the name of Russian law enforcers was changed from the Soviet-era term "militsiya" (militia) to the more universal "politsiya" (police) on March 1, 2011.
Personnel reduction and salary increase The number of police officers was reduced by 20%, dropping from 1.28 million to 1.1 million by 2012. The reduction was accomplished via a comprehensive evaluation of all officers. All evaluations occurred during or before June 2011, and those who failed the evaluation lost their jobs. All officers who had previously received administrative penalties or had links to the criminal underworld were fired. For those officers surviving the reduction, salaries were increased by 30%.
Centralization As a result of the reform, the Russian police were made a federal-level institution, with funding fully sourced from the federal budget. Under the old system, police units responsible for public order and petty crimes were under the jurisdiction of regional and city authorities, financed from the regional budget, and were more responsible to the regional governors than to the central federal government.
Changes to police and detainee rights According to the new law, detainees will receive the right to make a telephone call within 3 hours of the detention. They will also receive the right to have a lawyer and interpreter from the moment of their detention, and police must inform the detainee of their rights and duties. The police no longer have the right to carry out and demand checks of a company's financial and business activities. Police may also no longer detain a citizen for an hour just to verify his/her identity.
Thus, on August 7, 2010, a new bill Law “On police” was proposed (the same bill with the changed names “militsiya” to “police”).

The new bill is a continuation of the opposite policy of the reform of 2002, that is, even greater centralization. Institutions of the public security militsiya and criminal militsiya are being abolished. Unlike the militsiya, which are partially subordinate to the authority of the subject of the federation, the police are not connected with the subject of the federation (according to the bill).

About 5 million people took part in the online discussion of the draft law “On police”, which is unique for Russia. As a result, the draft law, in comparison with the initial form, has undergone significant changes related to the powers of the new structure. In particular, the provisions that police officers can freely enter the premises of citizens, land plots belonging to them, on territories, land plots and premises occupied by public associations and organizations, as well as the “presumption of legality” of the police, which caused the most criticism (“The police officer’s demands addressed to citizens and officials and the actions taken by him are considered legal until otherwise established in the manner prescribed by law”), although, according to opposition politicians, this wording was only veiled, and not excluded.

Despite criticism from certain segments of society and a number of opposition political parties, the draft law was adopted in the first reading on December 10, 2010. The State Duma on Friday, January 28, 2011, adopted the draft law “On police” in the final third reading. Only 315 deputies voted for the adoption of the law, 130 were against, there were no abstentions.

It was originally planned that the new law would come into force in January 2011, but the police in Russia officially revived on March 1, 2011.

On February 7, 2011, the President tweeted a message:

On March 1, 2011, the Police Act entered into force, and as of January 1, 2012, all symbols of the police became invalid.

Insignia 
Russian Police officers wear uniforms in accordance with the order of the Ministry of Internal Affairs of the Russian Federation of July 26, 2013 N 575 “On approval of the Rules for the wearing of uniforms, insignia and departmental insignia by employees of the internal affairs bodies of the Russian Federation”.

The insignia of special distinction of the officers of the operational regiments of the Russian police is a black beret.

For employees of the tourist police, a sleeve sign with the words “ТУРИСТИЧЕСКАЯ ПОЛИЦИЯ TOURIST POLICE” and the flag of Russia.

Police ranks 
The Russian Police do not use the rank of corporal. 
Officers

Other ranks

† This rank is an approximate comparison to corporal, but in US Army corporal refers to Enlisted, not NCO's

Central administration 

 Criminal Police Service: Criminal Investigations Department (Russian: Уголовный розыск)
 Main Office for Criminal Investigation
 Main Directorate for Public Order Maintenance (Patrol police) (Russian: Главное управление по обеспечению охраны общественного порядка)
Main Directorate for Road Traffic Safety (Traffic police) (Russian: Государственная инспекция безопасности дорожного движения)
 Main Office for Combating Economic and Tax Crimes (Russian:Отдел борьбы с экономическими преступлениями)
 Office for Operational Investigation Information
 Co-ordination Office of Criminal Police Service
 Main Office of the Interior for Transport
 Office for Crisis Situations
 Office for Resource Provisions
 Finance and Economy Office
 Logistical Service
 Office for Material and Technical Support
 Co-ordination Office of Logistical Service
 Medical Office
 Finance and Economy Department
 Office for Communication and Automation
 Office for Capital Construction
 General Services Office
 Independent Divisions
 Main Office for Internal Security
 Investigative Office
 Main office for Drug Enforcement (former Federal Drug Control Service of Russia)
Main office for Migration issues (former Federal Migratory Service)
 Control and Auditing Office
 Forensic Expertise Center
 National Central Bureau for Interpol
 Mobilization Training Office
 Main Center for Information
 Main Legal Office
 Office for International Co-operation
 Office for Information Regional Contacts

Equipment

Transportation

Russian police use a number of different models of automobiles which range greatly in age and technical specification.

Weaponry
 AK-74M
 AKS-74U
 AS Val
 OTs-14 Groza
 PP-19 Bizon
 9A-91 carbine
 A-91 rifle
 Makarov pistol
 OTs-02 Kiparis
 PP-91 KEDR
 Saiga-12S shotgun
 MP-443 Grach pistol
 GSh-18 pistol
 PP-2000
 KS-23 shotgun
 Vityaz-SN
 CZ-75
 AEK-971
 AK-103
 AK-104

See also

Police Department of Russia
Militsiya
Ministry of Internal Affairs
Moscow Police
Saint Petersburg Police
Nizhny Novgorod Police
Crimea Police
National Police of Ukraine
Registered Cossacks of the Russian Federation (Государственный реестр казачьих обществ Российской Федерации)
Marengo, a color used for police uniform.

General:
 Law enforcement in Russia
 Crime in Russia

References

External links
Russian Federation "Law on police"

Federal law enforcement agencies of Russia
Government agencies established in 2011
Ministry of Internal Affairs (Russia)
National police forces